Canopy may refer to:

Plants
 Canopy (biology), aboveground portion of plant community or crop (including forests)
 Canopy (grape), aboveground portion of grapes

Religion and ceremonies
 Baldachin or canopy of state, typically placed over an altar or throne
 Chuppah, a canopy used in Jewish wedding ceremonies
 Umbraculum, a canopy awarded by the pope to basilicas
 Vapor canopy, a creationist idea that earth was surrounded by a "canopy" of water

As a proper name

Transportation
 Canopy (aircraft), transparent enclosure over aircraft cockpit
 Camper shell, or canopy, a raised, rigid covering for the rear bed of a pickup truck
 Honda Canopy, a three-wheeled automobile from Honda

Brands and organizations
 Canopy (hotel), a brand within the corporate structure of Hilton Worldwide
 Canopy Group, U.S. investment firm
 OP Canopy, Canadian Forces Operation

Computing
 Enthought Canopy, a Python distribution and analysis environment for scientific and analytic computing
 Motorola Canopy, wireless networking system

Other uses
 Canopy (film), a 2013 Australian war film

Other uses
 Canopy (building), overhead roof or structure that provides shade or other shelter
 Canopy (parachute), cloth and suspension line portion of parachute
 Canopy bed, a type of bed
 Vehicle canopy, type of overhead door for vehicle

See also
 Canapé, a small decorative food item
 Kanopy, an on-demand streaming video platform for public libraries and universities